Siebe Horemans (born 2 June 1998) is a Belgian professional footballer who plays as a centre-back for Eredivisie club Excelsior.

Club career

Gent
Horemans is a youth exponent from Gent. He made his senior debut on 4 August 2016 in the UEFA Europa League against Viitorul Constanța. Gent manager Hein Vanhaezebrouck gave him a spot in his starting line-up. Horemans made his debut in the domestic league later that month, on 21 August in the home match against Westerlo, which was won 4–2.

On 31 January 2017, Gent announced that Horemans, together with Lucas Schoofs, was sent on loan to second division club OH Leuven for the remainder of the season to get some first team experience.

At the start of the 2017–18 season, Horemans returned to Gent. His contract was also extended by two years until 2020. At the beginning of 2018, he suffered an anterior cruciate ligament injury, which required surgery and sidelined him for six months.

Excelsior
In the 2018–19 season, Horemans played on loan for Dutch Eredivisie club Excelsior. After a long injury, Horemans made his debut for the club on 3 February 2019 in a Rotterdam derby against Feyenoord, which resulted in a surprising 2–1 win. Despite only making 11 total appearances for the club that season due to a lingering injury, as Excelsior suffered relegation to the Eerste Divisie, Horemans was signed on a permanent deal in July 2019.

International career
Horemans played for several Belgium national youth teams. He was part of the national under-17 squad at the 2015 UEFA European Under-17 Championship, but failed to make an appearance.

References

1998 births
Living people
Belgian footballers
Belgium youth international footballers
Association football defenders
K.A.A. Gent players
Oud-Heverlee Leuven players
Excelsior Rotterdam players
Belgian Pro League players
Challenger Pro League players
Eredivisie players
Eerste Divisie players
Belgian expatriate footballers
Expatriate footballers in the Netherlands
Belgian expatriate sportspeople in the Netherlands